Mara Buneva (1902 – January 13, 1928) was a Macedonian Bulgarian revolutionary, member of the Internal Macedonian Revolutionary Organization. She is famous for the assassination of the former Serbian Chetnik commander and Yugoslav legal official of the Skopje Oblast Velimir Prelić, after which she committed suicide. Today Buneva is considered as a heroine in Bulgaria, while in Serbia and North Macedonia she is regarded as a controversial Bulgarophile.

Biography 
Buneva was born in 1902 in Tetovo, then in the Kosovo Vilayet of the Ottoman Empire. By Serb sourches, comes from the Bunevci family from the Tetovo village of Setole, whose baptismal Slava is Vavedenje.
Between 1915 and 1918 when Vardar Macedonia was under Bulgarian rule, Buneva studied at the Skopje's Girls' High School. Her father Nikola Bunev was the mayor of Tetovo.

In 1919 Buneva moved to Bulgaria. There she studied at the Sofia University, and married a Bulgarian officer. In 1926 she divorced, and under the influence of her brother Boris, also a Bulgarian officer, Buneva joined the Internal Macedonian Revolutionary Organization (IMRO). Later on direct order by the leader of the IMRO, Ivan Mihaylov, she was trained in Sofia for fulfilling of a future terrorist actions.  In 1927 she went back to Yugoslavia and opened a shop in Skopje with a conspiratorial mission.

There she managed to acquaint herself with Velimir Prelić, the legal adviser of the Serbian governor of the Skopje district. Prelić had been known for ordering arrests and tortures of young local students, members of Macedonian Youth Secret Revolutionary Organization. The organization was discovered by the authorities in May 1927 and its leaders were arrested. On a trial in Skopje against 20 of them, most were sentenced in December to long-term imprisonment. As result IMRO ordered the execution of Prelić. At the appointed time on January 13, 1928, Buneva intercepted him on his way to lunch and shot the official after which she committed suicide. On the next day, the Serbian police buried Buneva's body at an unknown place. Prelić also died in hospital a few days later and was buried in Skopje.

Legacy and controversy

Her act echoed as in Bulgaria and Europe, as well as among the Macedono-Bulgarian emigration in America. The first Macedonian Patriotic Organization ladies auxiliary branch was created in Toronto in 1928 and named after Mara Buneva. In Bulgaria she was celebrated as a martyr for the freedom of Macedonia. During the Second World War Bulgaria annexed Vardar Macedonia and on the place of the death of Mara Buneva a commemoration plate was mounted. However, later it was destroyed by the new Yugoslav communist authorities.

Since the beginning of the 2000s, almost every year on the day of her death, Bulgarians from North Macedonia and from Bulgarian, particularly VMRO-BND activists, have begun illegally mounting new commemoration plates. However, the plates are quickly removed or destroyed. In January 2007 the celebration ended with a fight in Skopje.

A wax figure of Buneva was set up in the Museum of the Macedonian Struggle opened in 2011 in Skopje. Former Macedonian Prime Minister Ljubčo Georgievski claims that to be against Buneva means, not to have adequate knowledge of the history, and to defend the Serbian chauvinism. According to Bulgarian officials, the repetitive incidents in Skopje are part of an ongoing anti-Bulgarian campaign there.

However, some Macedonian patriotic associations have also declared Buneva as an ethnic Macedonian heroine and claimed that she was appropriated by the Bulgarians. Later, even a commemorative plaque in Macedonian was placed by a patriotic association there.

Honours

Buneva Point in Antarctica is named after Mara Buneva.

See also 

 Mencha Karnicheva
 Macedonian nationalism

References

1902 births
1928 deaths
People from Tetovo
People from Kosovo vilayet
Bulgarian revolutionaries
Bulgarian assassins
Yugoslav Macedonia
Members of the Internal Macedonian Revolutionary Organization
Macedonian Bulgarians
Deaths by firearm in Yugoslavia
Bulgarian nationalist assassins
Bulgarian nationalists
1928 suicides